Sembukudipatti, is a small village near Vadipatti situated 22 km North West of Madurai in Tamil Nadu, India. This village is best known for the Metal Park Mountain, Vaguthumalai in Tamil, 1 km north to it. By means of blue-metal quarries this mountain contributes some useful amount of revenue to the Vadipatti Taluk. This village comes under the Alanganallur Panchayat Union. Village has population of more than 1,200 as on Census Report 2001.

References

Villages in Madurai district